Jellyfish is a short story collection by Scottish author Janice Galloway, published by Freight Books in 2015.

Major themes 
In the epigraph to Jellyfish, Galloway notes that she seeks to redefine David Lodge's idea that "Literature is mostly about having sex and not much about having children; life’s the other way around." Throughout the 14 stories in Jellyfish, Galloway connects the themes sex, love, and parenthood, as well as both mental and physical illnesses.

Reception and awards 
Jellyfish was short-listed for the Saltire Society Literary Award in 2015 in literary fiction and long-listed for the Frank O'Connor International Short Story Award.

References 

2015 short story collections
Scottish short story collections